The Lakshmi Devi temple  is an early 12th-century Hindu temples complex located in Doddagaddavalli village in Hassan District, Karnataka India. The main temple consists of four-shrines that share a common mandapa (hall), each sanctum being a square and aligned to a cardinal direction. The eastern shrine has Goddess Lakshmi, the northern shrine is dedicated to Kali-Durga, the western to Shiva, and the southern is empty and likely Vishnu. The complex has a separate Bhairava shrine to the northeast of the main temple, and four small shrines at the corners inside a nearly square prakara (compound). All nine temples are notable for its pyramidal north Indian style Nagara shikhara – likely an influence from Maharashtra and an evidence of active flow of ideas between the southern, central and northern India. The complex has additional smaller shrines.

Location and date
Doddagaddavalli is called Gadumballi in historic inscriptions. The temple is to the south side of the modern village, on the banks of a historic water reservoir. The Lakshmi Devi temple, was  built in 1113 CE by a wealthy merchant Kullahana Rahuta and his wife Sahaj Devi during the reign of Vishnuvardhana.

Architecture

The temples complex is within a seven feet high prakara (compound), almost a 115 feet square. It had a dvara-mandapa to its west and a dvarasobha to its east, but these along with the original compound decoration is now missing except for the door frames and the mandapa-like structure. It is likely that the original town was near the manmade reservoir. Inside the historic prakara were four small shrines at each corner, a design called parivaralayas in Sanskrit texts. In addition, to the northeast of the main temple, there is a fifth independent shrine dedicated to Bhairava. At the center is the chatuskuta (four-shrine) main temple with a shared mandapa. Thus, the complex consists of nine shrines.

The Lakshmi Devi Temple is one of the earliest known temples built in the Hoysala style. The building material is Chloritic schist, more commonly known as soapstone. 

The temple does not stand on a jagati (platform). Three of the vimanas (shrines) have a common square mantapa (hall). The fourth vimana, one at the north and dedicated to Kali, is connected to the mantapa via an oblong extension. The extension has two lateral entrances into the temple, one from east, the other west. The vimanas have their original phamsana-style tower (superstructure) intact. These illustrate the Kadamba Nagara architecture. Of the nine shrines in this complex, eight vimanas are simple phamsana and symmetric within each set. The ninth vimana that opens to the east is different – it is a tritala (three storey) superstructure and is dedicated to goddess Lakshmi, thus making her the primary deity and giving this temple its dedicatory name.

Each of the three vimanas that share a mandapa has an ardha-mantapa (vestibule) connecting it to the central larger square ranga-mantapa. On top of the vestibule of each shrine is a sukanasi (or "nose" because it looks like low extension of the main tower over the shrine). The sukanasi is a tier lower than the main phamsana tower over the shrine. All the four sukanasi are intact and so are the kalasha (decorative water pot like structure) on top of the main towers. The Hoysala emblem (the sculpture of a legendary warrior "Sala" fighting a lion) is mounted atop one of the Sukanasi.

The mantapa is open and square. It and the extension to the Kali shrine has a jali (perforated stone screens) to let light into the temples. The ceiling of the main hall is supported by eighteen lathe-turned pillars. Near Kali's shrine, there is stone statue of an emaciated skeleton-like goblin (vetala), a reminder of her horrifying fierceness and power to inflict death. 

According to art critic Gerard Foekema, overall the temple has shows the pre-Hoysala elements of architecture. There is only one eaves running round the temple where the main towers meet the wall of the shrine. At the base of the wall of the shrines are five moldings; between the moldings and the eaves, the usual panels of Hoysala sculptures depicting Hindu gods, goddesses and their attendants is however missing. Instead, the entire space is taken up by decorative miniature towers on pilasters (called aedicule). 

The main shrine facing east has a  image of the goddess Lakshmi with an attendant on either side. The image holds Vishnu's icons – a conch in the upper right hand, a chakra (discuss) in the upper left, a rosary in the lower right and a mace in the lower left. In the shrines facing north, south and west respectively are the images of Kali (a form of Durga), the god Vishnu, and Boothanatha Linga (the universal symbol of the god Shiva). A sculpture of Tandaveswara (dancing Shiva) exists in the circular panel at the center of the ceiling of the mantapa. Other notable artwork are those of Gajalakshmi (form of Lakshmi with elephants on either side), Tandaveshwara and Yoganarasimha (avatars of Vishnu) found on the doorway of the temple.The main attraction of this beautiful temple is that it includes the worship of both Shaivism and Vaishnavism. However recently on November 20, 2020, the temple was subjected to theft and destruction.

Gallery

References

Bibliography
 Gerard Foekema, A Complete Guide To Hoysala Temples, 1996, Abhinav,

External links

 More information

Religious buildings and structures completed in 1114
12th-century Hindu temples
Devi temples in Karnataka
Hindu temples in Hassan district